Aethalochroa spinipes, common name stick mantis, is a species of praying mantis native to Pakistan and India.

See also
List of mantis genera and species

References

Aethalochroa
Insects of Asia
Insects described in 1889
Taxa named by James Wood-Mason